Moaf (also Romanized as Mo‘āf) is a village in Chahar Farizeh Rural District, in the Central District of Bandar-e Anzali County, Gilan Province, Iran. At the 2006 census, its population was 219, in 75 families.

References 

Populated places in Bandar-e Anzali County